Alexander Mauricio Rosso Génova (born February 27, 1993) is a Uruguayan footballer who plays for Progreso in Uruguayan Primera División.

Career
Rosso began his career in 2012 with River Plate Montevideo, where he played for three seasons, until now.

References

1993 births
Living people
Uruguayan footballers
Uruguayan expatriate footballers
Club Atlético River Plate (Montevideo) players
C.A. Progreso players
Club Deportivo Universidad César Vallejo footballers
Association football forwards
Uruguayan Primera División players
Peruvian Primera División players
Uruguayan expatriate sportspeople in Peru
Expatriate footballers in Peru